Benigno Asunción Ferreira (January 13, 1846 – June 14, 1920) was President of Paraguay November 25, 1906 – July 4, 1908. He was a member of the Liberal Party.

The general and doctor Benigno Ferrerira was one of the main protagonists in the postwar period of' ‘70 and one of the most respected political leaders of his era.

Born in Tapuá Grande (nowadays Limpio), January 13, 1846. Son of María Concepción Ferreira and Angel Joaquín Mora Coene. His sisters were: Susana (married to Silvestre Aveiro) and Mercedes
(married to Federico Guillermo Baez, former president of the Constitutional Convention of 1870).

His Life 

Born January 13, 1846 in Mora Cué, today Jurisdiction of Limpio, the former Tapuá. Son of Joaquin Angel Mora Coene and María Concepción Ferreira. This marriage could not be legalized because of the refusal of the dictator Francia, at the end of his life, to grant permission. Despite being a recognized son, Benigno chose to take the mother's maiden name.

The entry into Colegio de San Carlos of Asunción was prevented to young Benigno, son of an opponent, by order of Don Carlos Antonio López, president of the republic.

Historian Manuel Pesoa mentions that his baptism godfather was the Argentine consul general Jose Tomas Ramirez, representing general Justo José de Urquiza, who favored his godson with a scholarship at the College of Concepción Uruguay in the province of Entre Ríos, Argentina. There, Benigno Ferreira engaged relationship with other young Argentines and Paraguayans.

He later moved to Buenos Aires to begin his studies of Law at the University. His career was interrupted by the outbreak of war against Paraguay 1865.

His political career 

The Paraguayan colony in Buenos Aires was formed by families who had left their homeland for political reasons. In this midst of liberal ideas they criticized the authoritarianism of the Lopez and their cruel police procedures. A group of Paraguayan students began organizing a united front to fight the regime of Asuncion.

They published articles in the press in Buenos Aires and even signed manifestos. Ferreira was a full-fledged liberal. His ideology was in line with that of other young people who encouraged principles of liberty.

All this activity was closely followed by Lopez's agents, who took harsh reprisals against Benigno's mother "due to the criminal conduct of his son." Mrs. Concepcion was seized and tortured to declare against her missing son.

Having noticed the pain in which his mother was put in, he consolidated the intention to take a position that in the eyes of some Paraguayans was considered vile. Arturo Bray noted that Ferreira was a man of laws, but that the imperative of the facts made him assume positions such as enrolling in the ranks of the army. At age 19 he joined the Paraguayan Legion.

By knowing the secret Treaty of the Triple Alliance, Benigno Ferreira would appear in person before General Urquiza to convey the following: "We have been deceived. The treaty of alliance is a disgrace to the signatory governments, an insult to my homeland and a mockery to civilization." Ferreira resigned and returned to Buenos Aires to devote himself to journalism in the newspaper "La Republica", in whose columns continued to lambaste the Alliance.

Some modern historians argue that "the right attitude against the issue of legionnaires is to try to get in place of the exiles, observing his actions and his deeds in the light of the political principles and social force in his time."

After the occupation of Asuncion, Benigno Ferreira was appointed captain of the port of the capital. In September 1869 he joined the Freemasons.

The following month he was among the drafters of the newspaper "La Regeneración".

In 1870, he was elected member of the committee of “The Great People's Club” led by Facundo Machaín and a few days later assumed command of a battalion of National Guard with the rank of Sergeant Major.

His government 

Figure from an early age in national politics he became minister of War and Navy in 1871 during the government of Cirilo Antonio Rivarola. In the troubled atmosphere of the reorganization of the Public State, he took over a bench in the Lower House and later served as minister of Justice.

He dealt with three armed revolts in the years ‘73 and ‘74. As a result of latter, he was forced to endure a long exile (1874–1895), a period in which obtained a doctorate in law in Buenos Aires.

He found upon his return a divided Liberal Party, this time between civic and radicals.

He actively participated in the civil war in 1904 when the Pilcomayo Pact was signed. When the new government was installed, he went back to the position of minister of War and Navy and later became a member of the Superior Court.

On November 25, 1906, he took the first magistracy, being his vice president Don Emiliano González Navero.

His Cabinet was composed of Don Emiliano González Navero as the vice-president and Adolfo R. Soler as Finance Minister. Manuel Brítez in the Ministry of Interior, Carlos L. Isasi in the Ministry of Justice, Guillermo de los Rios as Minister for Religious Affairs and Public Instruction, Manuel J. Duarte as Minister of War and Navy and Cecilio Báez as Chancellor.

The civic were defeated and the general chairman Benigno Ferreira dismissed.

Government work 

His government  established new telegraph lines, the Normal Teachers School moved to Villarica and the number of primary schools increased. He also closed military courses and built barracks in the towns of the countryside as well as a building for the capital customs.

On the other hand, he settled a long conflict with the large railroad company, the Bank of the Republic was founded, the treaty Soler-Pinilla with Bolivia, was signed, and warlike equipments were acquired from Europe.

Death and exile 

He marched into exile once again. He found death in Buenos Aires in 1920. The coffin was transferred directly to the Government Palace in Asuncion for the wake.

References 

 "General Dr. Benigno Ferreira." Manuel Pesoa
 "Builders of Paraguay." Raul Amaral

External links 
 InfoLuque
 Years Blue

1846 births
1920 deaths
People from Limpio
Liberal Party (Paraguay) politicians
Presidents of Paraguay
19th-century Paraguayan lawyers